William Edwin Clare (21 September 1883 – 1944) was an English professional footballer who played as a full back in the Football League for Notts County. He also played Southern League football for Brighton & Hove Albion.

Life and career
William Edwin Clare was born in Basford, Nottinghamshire, on 21 September 1883, the son of a coal-mining contractor. He played local football for clubs including Kirkby Rovers, Bentinck Colliery Welfare and Mansfield Woodhouse, and signed for Notts County in 1904. He made his debut at the end of the 1903–04 season, in a 2–0 loss away to Small Heath in the First Division, and made five more league appearances the following season. He signed for Brighton & Hove Albion in May 1905. He began as a regular, but was displaced by Tom Turner, made no more appearances in the Southern League team, and left the club at the end of the season. He later played for Mansfield Wesleyans.

Clare also played cricket professionally. He joined Nottinghamshire County Cricket Club's ground staff as a 17-year-old, and played at least once for the club's Second XI, before continuing his career as a club professional with West Norfolk, Redcar of the North Yorkshire and South Durham League, and Ribblesdale League club Burnley St Andrew's, whose local newspaper described him as a "powerful-looking young fellow", "a fast bowler and good bat".

In 1904, while a Notts County player, he received the Certificate of the Royal Humane Society for rescuing a child from the Grantham Canal:

Clare died in 1944 in Edmonton, Middlesex.

References

1883 births
1944 deaths
People from Basford, Nottinghamshire
Footballers from Nottinghamshire
English footballers
Association football fullbacks
Notts County F.C. players
Brighton & Hove Albion F.C. players
Mansfield Town F.C. players
English Football League players
Southern Football League players
English cricketers